Group B of the 2002 Fed Cup Asia/Oceania Zone Group II was one of two pools in the Asia/Oceania Zone Group I of the 2002 Fed Cup. Five teams competed in a round robin competition, with the top two teams advancing to the play-offs and the bottom team being relegated to Group II for next year.

China vs. Thailand

Japan vs. Philippines

Hong Kong vs. Uzbekistan

China vs. Hong Kong

Japan vs. Thailand

Uzbekistan vs. Philippines

China vs. Philippines

Japan vs. Uzbekistan

Hong Kong vs. Thailand

China vs. Uzbekistan

Japan vs. Hong Kong

Thailand vs. Philippines

China vs. Japan

Hong Kong vs. Philippines

Thailand vs. Uzbekistan

  failed to win any ties in the pool, and thus was relegated to Group II in 2003, where they finished second overall and thus advanced back to Group I for 2004.

See also
Fed Cup structure

References

External links
 Fed Cup website

2002 Fed Cup Asia/Oceania Zone